PGA Tour 2K23 is a sports video game developed by HB Studios and published by 2K Sports for Microsoft Windows, PlayStation 4, PlayStation 5, Xbox One and Xbox Series X/S. It's the fifth installment of the PGA Tour 2K series and first game in the series to feature the Top of the Rock golf course as bonus content.

Reception

PGA Tour 2K23 received "generally favorable" reviews, according to review aggregator Metacritic.

References

External links

2022 video games
2K Sports games
Golf video games
HB Studios games
Multiplayer and single-player video games
PlayStation 4 games
PlayStation 5 games
Sports video games with career mode
Video games developed in Canada
Windows games
Xbox One games
Xbox Series X and Series S games